Bradshaw House may refer to:

in the United States (by state then city)
Bradshaw House (Birmingham, Alabama), listed on the National Register of Historic Places (NRHP) in Birmingham, Alabama
Matthews-Bradshaw House, North Little Rock, Arkansas, NRHP-listed in Pulaski County
Bradshaw-Duncan House, Crestwood, Kentucky, NRHP-listed in Oldham County
Bradshaw House (Hopkinsville, Kentucky), NRHP-listed in Christian County
Bradshaw-Booth House, Enterprise, Mississippi, NRHP-listed in Clarke County
Parker-Bradshaw House, Lufkin, Texas, NRHP-listed in Angelina County
George Albert Bradshaw House, Beaver, Utah, NRHP-listed in Beaver County
Bradshaw House-Hotel, Hurricane, Utah, NRHP-listed in Washington County
George Bradshaw House and Joshua Salisbury/George Bradshaw Barn, Wellsville, Utah, NRHP-listed in Cache County